Puthenthope Beach is the vast and beautiful beach in Thiruvananthapuram district of Kerala, south India.

External links

Beaches of Kerala
Geography of Thiruvananthapuram